Long Walk Home: Music from the Rabbit-Proof Fence, released in June 2002, is the fourth soundtrack album and twelfth album overall by the English rock musician Peter Gabriel. Devised as the soundtrack to the Australian film Rabbit-Proof Fence, it was the first release of new music by Peter Gabriel since OVO, also a soundtrack.

Critical reception

Billboard included Long Walk Home in its reviews Spotlights section, deeming it "to deserve special attention on the basis of musical merit and/or Billboard chart potential". Billboard reviewer Bradley Bambarger recommended the album to fans of Gabriel's album Passion—the soundtrack for the film The Last Temptation of Christ—writing, "the intrepid artist's soundtrack to the Australian film Rabbit-Proof Fence should prove nearly as compelling". He described the album as "atmospheric, often ominously so" and as having "a cumulative emotive power" due to its "interwoven motifs".

Track listing

The tracks "Ngankarrparni" and "Cloudless" contain looped samples from the track "Sky Blue", released on Gabriel's album Up.

Personnel

Musicians
 Peter Gabriel – keyboard (1–5, 7–13, 15), Surdu (1), clap sticks (2), piano (8, 13, 15), vocals (10, 13, 15), drum programming (13), production
 Richard Evans – hammered dulcimer (1, 11), 12 string guitar (1), clap sticks (1–3, 5, 10), bowed crotales (2), bass (5, 9, 11–13, 15), piano (6), guitar (7), shaker (8), whistle (10, 12), keyboard (13), acoustic guitar (15), arrangements, mixing, production (1–14), recording
 David Rhodes – surdu (1–4, 7–12), percussion (1), keyboard bass (1), clap sticks (2, 3, 5, 10), vocals (2, 9, 10), digeridoo (2, 7), guitar (5, 7, 9, 11), hit (7), shaker (8, 11, 12), gong (12), electric guitar (13, 15), backing vocals (13, 15), berimbau (14), acoustic guitar (15), arrangements, mixing (1–14), production (1–14)
 Ged Lynch – drums (1, 5, 8–10, 13, 15), percussion (1, 2, 5, 7, 8, 11, 13, 15), toms (2)
 Electra String - strings (1, 7, 12)
 Jangangpa Group – voices (1, 7, 11)
 Myarn Lawford – voices (1, 7, 11, 14), wailing (2, 14), vocals (9, 11, 13, 15)
 Elsie Thomas – voices (1, 7, 11)
 Jewess James – voices (1, 7, 11)
 Rosie Goodji – voices (1, 7, 11)
 The Dhol Foundation – dhol drums (2, 5, 10)
 Adzido – percussion (2, 9, 10)
 Johnny Kalsi – galloping percussion (2)
 Ningali Lawford – wailing (2, 14), vocals (13, 15)
 Shankar – double violin (3, 5–7, 10, 12, 14)
 London Session Orchestra – strings (3, 5, 11, 12)
 Gavin Wright – violin (3, 5, 10–13, 15)
 Jackie Shave – violin (3, 5, 10–13, 15)
 Ganga Giri – didgeridoo (4–8, 10–12, 15)
 James McNally – bodhran (5)
 Hossam Ramzy – finger cymbals (5)
 B'Net Houariyat – vocals (5)
 Alex Swift – programming (8, 13, 15)
 Tomasz Kukurba – violin (8)
 Jerzy Bawol – accordion (8)
 Mahut – percussion (8)
 Doudou N'Diaye Rose – African loops (8)
 Chuck Norman – programming (9, 10, 13, 15), keyboard (10, 13, 15)
 Babacar Faye – djembes (9)
 Assane Thiam – talking drum (9)
 Nusrat Fateh Ali Khan – vocals (11)
 The Blind Boys of Alabama – vocals (13, 15)
 Peter Green – electric guitar (13, 15)
 Richard Chappell – drum programming (13, 15), tambourine loops (15), additional recording
 Manu Katché – drums (13, 15)
 David Sancious – Hammond organ (13, 15)
 Sheryl Carter – wailing (14)
 Quantec – drones (14)
 Dmitri Pokrovsky – kaliuka (14)
 Stephen Hague – drums (15), bass programming (15), mixing (15), production (15)

Technical personnel
 Edel Griffith – assistant engineering, additional recording, additional engineering
 Marco Migliari – assistant engineering
 Dan Roe – assistant engineering
 Paul Grady – assistant engineering
 Steve Orchard – additional recording, additional engineering
 Michael Brook – additional recording, additional engineering
 Derek Zuzarte – additional recording, additional engineering
 Kevin Quah – assistant additional recording, assistant additional engineering
 Yang – assistant additional recording, assistant additional engineering
 Tchad Blake – London Session Orchestra treatments
 Tony Cousins – mastering
 Andrew Skeoch – birds and dingoes recording (1, 4, 7, 9, 10–12)
 Sarah Koschak – birds and dingoes recording (1, 4, 7, 9, 10–12)
 Marc Bessant – graphic design
 Susie Millns – design coordination
 Dorothy Napangardi – front cover painting
 Jimmy Pike – back cover of booklet painting, inside inlay and CD face painting
 Matthew Nettheim – photography
 Penny Tweedie – photography
 Merv Bishop – photography

References

Peter Gabriel soundtracks
Drama film soundtracks
Albums produced by Peter Gabriel
2002 soundtrack albums
Real World Records soundtracks